2004–05 Second League of Serbia and Montenegro – Group Montenegro was one of the two groups of the Second League of Serbia and Montenegro (Budućnost Podgorica, Sutjeska Nikšić and Zeta competed in the First League).

League table

Relegation play-offs
The 9th placed team were played against the 2nd placed team of the Montenegrin Republic League in two-legged relegation play-offs after the end of the season.

First leg

Second leg

Mornar remained in the Second League, while Gusinje remained in the Republic League.

External links

Montenegrin First League seasons
2
Monte